Coppull railway station is a closed railway station in Coppull, England, situated on Station Road in the centre of the village.

Coppull was in the historic county of Lancashire and remains in the county's modern version.

History
The station was opened by the North Union Railway in 1838. The North Union later became part of the London and North Western Railway.
The station was resited about 70 yards in 1895
The station joined the London Midland and Scottish Railway during the Grouping in 1923 and passed to the London Midland Region of British Railways on nationalisation in 1948.

The station closed in October 1969.

Services
In 1922 eight "Down" (northbound) services called at Coppull on Mondays to Saturdays. Most were local services, with a Saturdays Only "Parliamentary", calling at most stations in a five and a half hour journey from Crewe to Carlisle. No trains called on Sundays. The "Up" service was similar.

Future
In 2019, councillors called for this station to be reopened.

References

Sources

External links
 The station on a 1948 OS map via npe maps
 Line and mileages via Railwaycodes

Disused railway stations in Chorley
Former North Union Railway stations
Railway stations in Great Britain opened in 1838
Railway stations in Great Britain closed in 1969
Beeching closures in England